Cameroon competed at the 2012 Summer Olympics in London, United Kingdom, from 27 July to 12 August 2012. This was the nation's thirteenth appearance at the Olympics.

Comité National Olympique et Sportif du Cameroun sent a total of 33 athletes to the Games, 10 men and 23 women, to compete in 9 sports. For the first time in its Olympic history, Cameroon was represented by more female than male athletes because of its presence in women's football. Freestyle wrestler and All-African Games gold medalist Annabelle Ali was the nation's flag bearer at the opening ceremony.

Cameroon left London with a bronze medal, after winning gold medals in athletics and football for three successive games. Seven of its athletes "defected" while participating in the Olympics, including the reserve goalkeeper Drusille Ngako, swimmer Paul Ekane Edingue and boxers Thomas Essomba, Christian Donfack Adjoufack, Abdon Mewoli, Blaise Yepmou Mendouo and Serge Ambomo.

Medalists

Athletics

Cameroonian athletes achieved qualifying standards in the following athletics events (up to a maximum of 3 athletes in each event at the 'A' Standard, and 1 at the 'B' Standard):

Men

Women

Boxing

Cameroon has qualified boxers for the following events

Men

Football

Cameroon has qualified a women's team.
 Women's team – 18 players

Women's tournament

Team roster

Group play

Judo

Rowing

Cameroon has qualified the following boats.

Men

Qualification Legend: FA=Final A (medal); FB=Final B (non-medal); FC=Final C (non-medal); FD=Final D (non-medal); FE=Final E (non-medal); FF=Final F (non-medal); SA/B=Semifinals A/B; SC/D=Semifinals C/D; SE/F=Semifinals E/F; QF=Quarterfinals; R=Repechage

Swimming

Cameroon has gained two "Universality places" from the FINA.

Men

Women

Table tennis

One Cameroon athlete qualified to participate.

Weightlifting

Two weightlifters from Cameroon qualified for the Olympics; 1 man and 1 woman. Madias Nzesso originally finished sixth in her event, but after all three medalists were disqualified for doping offenses, she was promoted to a bronze medal.

Wrestling

Cameroon qualified one athlete through a quota place.

Women's freestyle

See also
 Cameroon at the 2012 Summer Paralympics

References

External links 
 
 

Nations at the 2012 Summer Olympics
2012
Olympics